Jonathan Duncan Maloney (born 3 March 1985) is an English footballer who plays for Wetherby Athletic as a defender although he has also been utilised as a striker.

Career
Born in Leeds, West Yorkshire, Maloney started his career at Doncaster Rovers. He joined York City on a month's loan on 5 January 2005. This loan was extended for another month in late January. This was extended for a third month in late February. Maloney was released by Doncaster at the end of the 2004–05 season.

Following his release by Doncaster, Maloney went to the United States to play for the University of Montevallo men's soccer team. After four years at the University he returned to England and was invited to pre-season training with former club Doncaster, although he stated he was looking to earn a contract with another former club, York.

Following a successful trial he signed for Conference North side Harrogate Town on 27 July. Maloney would make 33 appearances, scoring his only goal of the season against Vauxhall Motors. He went on to sign for Harrogate Railway Athletic.

References

External links

1985 births
Living people
Footballers from Leeds
English footballers
Association football defenders
Association football forwards
Association football utility players
Doncaster Rovers F.C. players
York City F.C. players
Harrogate Town A.F.C. players
Harrogate Railway Athletic F.C. players
English Football League players
National League (English football) players
University of Montevallo alumni